Anna Marie Nanasi (July 6, 1944 – August 19, 2010), better known by her professional name Ahna Capri (also as Anna Capri), was an American film and television actress best known for her role as Tania (secretary of Han) in the martial-arts film Enter the Dragon.

Early life 
She was born to Hungarian parents in Budapest and arrived in the United States with her family as a refugee in 1950. Her younger brother, Louis, who used the stage name Peter Robbins, was the voice of Charlie Brown in the Peanuts animated specials.

Career 
Capri started her career as a child actress, appearing on such series as Father Knows Best, The Danny Thomas Show,  The Adventures of Rin Tin Tin, Leave It To Beaver --- in the role of Cindy Andrews in "Eddie's Sweater" (1963) & Cinda Dunsworth in "Lumpy's Scholarship" (1963)--- as Anna Capri, and a recurring role as Edie Westrope on The George Burns and Gracie Allen Show in 1958.  She made her film debut at the age of thirteen in Outlaw's Son. She appeared thereafter in more films and television series, including roles in two CBS westerns in 1959, as Dolly Cleary in "The Littlest Client" on Wanted: Dead or Alive, starring Steve McQueen, and as Debbie McCallin in "McCallin's Daughter" on Trackdown, with Robert Culp.

In 1962, Capri was cast in a recurring role as Mary Rose in the ABC/Warner Bros Television sitcom, Room for One More. She appeared on other ABC/WB series, including Maverick, Sugarfoot, Cheyenne, Bronco, 77 Sunset Strip.

In 1967, Capri appeared as Cpl. Terry Cahill in Season 3, Episode 17 "The Hunters and the Killers" of Twelve O'Clock High.

Later, Capri appeared in Branded, The Monroes, The Iron Horse, The Guns of Will Sonnett, Laredo, The Wild Wild West, Run for Your Life, The F.B.I., Banyon, Baretta, Banacek, Mannix, The Mod Squad, Ironside, Cannon, The Invaders, The Man From U.N.C.L.E., Adam-12, The Name of the Game, Police Story, Search, and Kojak.

In 1971, Capri played Linda Perry in two episodes of ABC's crime drama Dan August, starring Burt Reynolds. In 1972, she was cast in the film Payday, with Rip Torn in the lead role as a country music singer in Alabama. Beginning in the 1970s, she used the spelling Ahna Capri in order to reflect the correct pronunciation of her first name.

Death 
On August 9, 2010, Capri was in a car accident in which a 5-ton truck collided with her car. After 10 days in a coma and on life support, she died on August 19 at age 66.

Filmography

References

External links 
 
 

1944 births
2010 deaths
American film actresses
American television actresses
Actresses from Budapest
Actresses from Los Angeles
Road incident deaths in California
Hungarian emigrants to the United States
21st-century American women